This is a list of assets currently owned by Bell Media, a subsidiary of BCE Inc.

Note that this list does not include BCE's 28% interest in Maple Leaf Sports & Entertainment, which itself owns a majority interest in the digital specialty channels Leafs Nation Network, NBA TV Canada, and GolTV Canada. This interest is held by BCE through a different subsidiary, not through Bell Media.

This list also does not enumerate the various telecommunications or retail assets owned by BCE. For further information on those properties, refer to the article on Bell Canada.

CTV Inc.
CTV Inc. is the wholly-owned television broadcasting division of Bell Media. Bell Media owns 30 local television stations led by CTV Television Network; 29 specialty channels, including TSN and RDS; and four pay TV services, including Crave (formerly The Movie Network) and Super Écran.

CTV Inc. owns and operates the following stations, specialty channels, and pay-per-view & video-on-demand services.

Conventional television

CTV
 Calgary, Alberta - CFCN
 Edmonton, Alberta - CFRN
 Halifax, Nova Scotia - CJCH
 Kitchener, Ontario - CKCO
 Moncton, New Brunswick - CKCW
 Montreal, Quebec - CFCF
 North Bay, Ontario - CKNY
 Ottawa, Ontario - CJOH
 Prince Albert, Saskatchewan, CIPA
 Regina, Saskatchewan - CKCK
 Saint John, New Brunswick - CKLT
 Saskatoon, Saskatchewan - CFQC
 Sault Ste. Marie, Ontario - CHBX
 Sudbury, Ontario - CICI
 Sydney, Nova Scotia - CJCB
 Timmins, Ontario - CITO
 Toronto, Ontario - CFTO
 Vancouver, British Columbia - CIVT
 Winnipeg, Manitoba - CKY
 Yorkton, Saskatchewan - CICC

CTV 2
 Barrie, Ontario - CKVR
 Pembroke/Ottawa, Ontario - CHRO
 London, Ontario - CFPL
 Wheatley/Windsor, Ontario - CHWI
 Victoria, British Columbia - CIVI
Dawson Creek, British Columbia - CJDC
 Terrace, British Columbia - CFTK

Noovo
 Montreal, Quebec - CFJP
 Quebec City, Quebec - CFAP
 Saguenay, Quebec - CFKS
 Sherbrooke, Quebec - CFKS
 Trois-Rivières, Quebec - CFKS

Specialty channels

CTV
 CTV Atlantic

CTV 2
 CTV 2 Alberta
 CTV 2 Atlantic

CTV Entertainment
 CTV Comedy Channel
 CTV Drama Channel
 CTV Life Channel
CTV Movies
 CTV Sci-Fi Channel
CTV Snackable
CTV Throwback

CTV News
 BNN Bloomberg (licensed by Bloomberg L.P.)
 CTV News Channel
 CP24

CTV Specialty
CTV Specialty Television Inc. is jointly owned by Bell Media and ESPN Inc., with 70% and 30% voting interests respectively, and approximately 70% and 30% equity interests respectively. ESPN itself is 80% owned by The Walt Disney Company and 20% owned by Hearst Corporation.

 Discovery (joint venture with Warner Bros. Discovery)
 Animal Planet (joint venture with Warner Bros. Discovery and BBC Studios)
 Discovery Science (joint venture with Warner Bros. Discovery)
 Discovery Velocity (joint venture with Warner Bros. Discovery)
Investigation
Investigation Discovery
 ESPN Classic
 Réseau des sports (RDS)
 RDS2
 RDS Info
 The Sports Network (TSN)
 TSN1
 TSN2
 TSN3
 TSN4
 TSN5

Premium and PPV
 Cinépop
 Crave
Crave 1
Crave 2
Crave 3
 HBO
 Starz
Starz 1
Starz 2
 Super Écran 
 Vu!
Red Carpet Vu!
 Venus

Other English-language
 E! (licensed by NBCUniversal)
 MTV (licensed by Paramount Global)
MTV2 (licensed by Paramount Global)
 Much

Other French-language
 Canal D
 Canal Vie
 Investigation
 Vrak
 Z

Other assets
 Dome Productions (owned by Bell Media and Rogers Media Inc.) — a multi-platform production company that operates a fleet of 18 television production mobiles, one production/uplink truck, and three KU uplink tractors. Dome’s head office is in the Rogers Centre in Toronto.
Exploration Production Inc. and Exploration Distribution Inc. (56.06% owned by Bell Media) — Discovery Channel Canada's in-house production and distribution companies
Movie Entertainment — Crave's monthly in-house magazine

Bell Media Radio
Bell Media Radio (branded as iHeartRadio Canada) is the wholly-owned radio broadcasting division of Bell Media. Through iHeartRadio Canada, Bell Media also owns iHeartRadio Canada Sales and operates a localized version of the iHeartRadio online radio platform owned by iHeartMedia.

Bell Media owns the following radio network brands:

 BNN Bloomberg Radio
 Boom FM
 Bounce
 Énergie
 Funny
 Move Radio
 Pure Country
 Rouge FM
 TSN Radio
 Virgin Radio

Bell Media Radio owns and operates the following stations:

On February 14, 2018, the CRTC approved a Bell Media's application to acquire from Larche Communications Inc. the assets of the four English-language commercial radio stations CICZ-FM Midland, CICX-FM Orillia, CJOS-FM Owen Sound and CICS-FM Sudbury, Ontario.

Other assets
 Agincourt Productions Inc. — Bell Media's in-house production company
Astral Out-of-Home — an out-of-home advertising company, a division of Bell Media, located in the markets of British Columbia, Alberta, Ontario, Québec, and Nova Scotia.
 Autohound (unknown equity interest)
Bell Media Original Production — division used to produce original programming for Bell Media-owned networks
Crave — TV Everywhere video-streaming service
 CTV Music — music publishing
Environics Analytics
 Noovo Moi
 Megawheels Technologies Inc. (4%)
Pinewood Toronto Studios — a domestic and international film and television studio. Recent productions at the studio include It: Chapter Two, The Christmas Chronicles, A Simple Favor, Molly’s Game, The Expanse, and Star Trek: Discovery.
Much Digital Studios — a multi-channel network
Bell Media also operates more than 200 websites
Bell Media produces live theatrical shows via its partnership with Iconic Entertainment Studios

Environics Analytics 

Environics Analytics is a Canadian marketing and analytical services company, established in 2003, by founder and current President Jan Kestle, owned by Bell Media. The company is based in Toronto, Ontario. Environics Analytics Group Ltd. is owned by Bell Media, separate from Environics Research Group.

All staff report to Nauby Jacob, SVP of Products and Services at Bell Media.

Environics Analytics experts, studies and data are often cited in Canadian news media.

Founder Jan Kestle is one of Canada's leading experts on the use of privacy-friendly data.

Environics Analytics was one of a group of companies to object to the removal of the Canada 2011 Census long form.

Dormant or shuttered businesses
The following companies are divisions of Bell Media that are no longer active or been absorbed into another part of the company
 Craig Media (1948–2004)
 CHUM Limited (1945–2007)
 CKX-TV (1955–2009)
 CKNX-TV (1955–2009)
 Astral Media (1961–2013)
 WTSN (2001–2003)
 Telegram Corporation (1960–1971)
 Access Media Group (1994–2008)
 Mid-Canada Communications (1980–1990)
 Baton Broadcast System (1994–1998)
 CTVglobemedia (2001–2011)
 Baton Broadcasting (1971–1998)
 NHL Network Canada — 21.42% and managing partner
 BravoFACT
 MuchFACT

See also
 Lists of corporate assets

References

External links
 Bell Media website
 List of Bell Media assets

 
Bell Media